German submarine U-299 was a Type VIIC/41 U-boat of Nazi Germany's Kriegsmarine during World War II.

She was laid down on 1 March 1943 by the Bremer Vulkan Werft (yard) at Bremen-Vegesack as yard number 64, launched on 6 November 1943 and commissioned on 15 December with Oberleutnant zur See Helmuth Heinrich in command.

In six patrols, she sank no ships. She was a member of one wolfpack.

She surrendered at Kristiansand-Sud on 9 May 1945 and was sunk as part of Operation Deadlight on 4 December 1945.

Design
German Type VIIC/41 submarines were preceded by the heavier Type VIIC submarines. U-299 had a displacement of  when at the surface and  while submerged. She had two shafts and two  propellers.

U-299 was fitted with five  torpedo tubes (four fitted at the bow and one at the stern), fourteen torpedoes, one  SK C/35 naval gun, (220 rounds), one  Flak M42 and two  C/30 anti-aircraft guns. The boat had a complement of between forty-four and sixty.

Service history

The boat's service life began with training with the 8th U-boat Flotilla in December 1943. She was then transferred to the 11th flotilla for operations on 1 August 1944. She was reassigned to the 13th flotilla on 5 November and moved again to the 14th flotilla on 1 March 1945.

First and second patrols
U-295s first patrol was notable in that she came under air attack on 16 July 1944. The commander was wounded. She had been part of a defence line off the Norwegian coast.

She then embarked on a pair of short journeys between Bergen, Larvik and Kristiansand.

Her second foray, between Kristiansand and Bergen was uneventful.

Third and fourth patrols
The submarine's third sortie took her into the Barents Sea, off Murmansk.

Her fourth patrol started in Trondheim and finished in Bogenbrucht, (west of Narvik).

Fifth patrol
She departed Bogenbrucht on 18 January 1945 and arrived at Trondheim on the 21st.

Sixth patrol and fate
The boat departed Trondheim on 24 January 1945. Her route covered the North and Norwegian Seas. She docked in Kristiansand on 15 April. She was at sea for 84 days, her longest patrol.

She surrendered at Kristiansand-sud on 9 May 1945 and in accordance with the terms, she was transferred to Loch Ryan in western Scotland for Operation Deadlight on the 29th.

See also
 Battle of the Atlantic (1939-1945)

References

Bibliography

External links

German Type VIIC/41 submarines
U-boats commissioned in 1943
1943 ships
World War II submarines of Germany
Ships built in Bremen (state)
Operation Deadlight
U-boats scuttled in 1945
Maritime incidents in December 1945